Grayson County is a county located in the southwestern part of the Commonwealth of Virginia. As of the 2020 census, the population was 15,333. Its county seat is Independence.

History
Grayson County was founded in 1793 from part of Wythe County. It was named for William Grayson, delegate to the Continental Congress from 1784 to 1787 and one of the first two U.S. Senators from Virginia. The first courthouse was built in Greensville, later called Oldtown, constructed in 1794 and rebuilt beginning in 1832. In 1842, the Virginia General Assembly authorized the division of Grayson County, the northeastern portion becoming Carroll County.

During the American Civil War, little fighting occurred within Grayson County,VA. However, the "Grayson Dare Devils" (Company F, 4th Regiment of the Stonewall Brigade) were recruited from the Elk Creek Valley of Grayson County shortly after Virginia seceded, and sustained significant losses as the First Battle of Manassas. The Grayson Cavalry was Company C of the 8th Virginia Cavalry, which served until the war's end. Company D of the 50th Virginia Infantry was recruited in the Mouth of Wilson Community and they were known as the "Wilson Rifles."

The county seat since shortly before the American Civil War has been Independence, Virginia, since the former county seat had been centrally located until Carroll County split off (and Oldtown now is a district within Grayson county). The Old Grayson County Courthouse and Clerk's Office renovated circa 1834 still exists, but is now located near what since 1953 is the independent city of Galax, Virginia. Even by 1890 the nearest railroad to Grayson county was nine miles from the county line, a Norfolk and Western Railway stop called "Rural Retreat." Textile and then furniture factories arrived in Galax (which was planned as a town near the old village of Blair on a plateau beginning in 1903, and renamed after a plant harvested from the surrounding mountains). Also the New River was dammed at Fries to power a cotton mill, which also led to more direct service by the Norfolk and Western to Troutdale (which later faltered). Whitetop City and Fairwood also virtually disappeared during the Great Depression.

Geography
The southernmost point in Virginia lies in Grayson County. Additionally, it is the only county in Virginia containing an Oceanic climate.

Adjacent counties

National protected areas
 Blue Ridge Parkway (part)
 Jefferson National Forest (part)
 Mount Rogers National Recreation Area (part)

Major highways

Demographics

2020 census

Note: the US Census treats Hispanic/Latino as an ethnic category. This table excludes Latinos from the racial categories and assigns them to a separate category. Hispanics/Latinos can be of any race.

2000 Census
As of the census of 2000, there were 17,917 people, 7,259 households, and 5,088 families residing in the county.  The population density was 40 people per square mile (16/km2).  There were 9,123 housing units at an average density of 21 per square mile (8/km2).  The racial makeup of the county was 91.70% White, 6.79% Black or African American, 0.12% Native American, 0.07% Asian, 0.03% Pacific Islander, 0.70% from other races, and 0.60% from two or more races.  1.55% of the population were Hispanic or Latino of any race.

There were 7,259 households, out of which 26.40% had children under the           living with them, 57.60% were married couples living together, 8.50% had a female householder with no husband present, and 29.90% were non-families. 26.80% of all households were made up of individuals, and 12.90% had someone living alone who was 65 years of age or older.  The average household size was 2.31 and the average family size was 2.77.

In the county, the population was spread out, with 19.50% under the age of 18, 7.60% from 18 to 24, 29.80% from 25 to 44, 26.20% from 45 to 64, and 16.90% who were 65 years of age or older.  The median age was 40 years. For every 100 females there were 107.70 males.  For every 100 females age 18 and over, there were 109.70 males.

The median income for a household in the county was $28,676, and the median income for a family was $35,076. Males had a median income of $24,126 versus $17,856 for females. The per capita income for the county was $16,768.  About 10.00% of families and 13.60% of the population were below the poverty line, including 18.80% of those under age 18 and 16.30% of those age 65 or over.

Economy
Grayson is economically isolated, without an Interstate Highway and surrounded by mountains. It struggled to attract and retain business; a situation made much worse beginning in 2009 with the recession. Losses of jobs in the furniture and textile sectors resulted in an unemployment rate of 14.6%. As part of the reformation of county government beginning in 2009, the new but idle River North Correctional Center was activated by the state brought in several hundred jobs. County government efforts were successful in retaining Core Fitness' Nautilus facility as the largest employer in the county and integrating local businesses as part of their supply chain. Independence Lumber suffered significant losses in a fire in November 2012 which forced it to relocate operations to North Carolina. Efforts by the county led to the company rebuilding and reopening its facility in 2014 with 125 jobs.  By 2014 a focus on job creation brought additional business operations and 300 more jobs to the county and resulted in an unemployment rate of only 6.9%. By April 2019, the unemployment rate had plummeted to just 2.6%.

Government
In 2009, the county, in dire financial condition from mismanagement and the failing economy, hired Jonathan Sweet as County Administrator. The county debt was $18.3 million and operational expenses were being paid by added borrowing. By 2015 the county had reversed its fiscal direction, revitalized the business climate, and begun to regain the confidence of its citizens. The county fund balance was 35% of its operating expenses and government operations were financially stable with reduced debt.

Board of Supervisors
 At-Large District: John Fant (I)
 Elk Creek District: Brenda R. Sutherland (D)
 Oldtown District: Kenneth Ray Belton (R)
 Providence District: Mike Hash (R)
 Wilson District: Tom Revels (R)

Constitutional officers

‡Positions shared with Galax City.

Legislative representation
Grayson is represented by Republican C.W. "Bill" Carrico in the Virginia Senate, Republican Israel D. O'Quinn in the Virginia House of Delegates, and Republican H. Morgan Griffith in the U.S. House of Representatives. Grayson County High School is represented by Legend Hannah Halsey.

Education

Public high school
 Grayson County High School, Independence

Private high school
 Oak Hill Academy, Mouth of Wilson

Culture
Located in the Appalachian region of the United States, Grayson County has long been famous for its traditional, or "old-time" music and musicians.  Although the entire Appalachian region is known for its music, the region around Mount Airy, North Carolina and Galax, Virginia is one of the areas where this music has remained strongest, even among young people.  The Old Fiddler's Convention, one of the most prominent traditional music contests in the United States, has been held annually in Galax since 1935.  Grayson County is also the home of other fiddlers' conventions and old time and bluegrass festivals such as the Grayson County Fiddlers Convention, Fries Fiddlers Convention, and the Wayne C. Henderson Guitar Festival.  The Whitetop Mountain Band, The New Ballards Branch Bogtrotters, The Wolfe Brothers String Band, and the Konnarock Critters are among many of the best known old time bands of the area.

Communities

Towns
 Fries
 Independence
 Troutdale

Census-designated places
 Baywood
 Hilltown (partly in Carroll County)
 Stevens Creek

Other unincorporated communities

 Carsonville
 Comers Rock
 Elk Creek
 Fairview
 Flat Ridge
 Grant
 Mouth of Wilson
 Rugby
 Volney

Notable residents
 John Calhoun Dickenson (1815-1890), planter and politician
 Henry Whitter (1892–1941), early country musician
 Wade Ward (1892–1971), old-time country music banjo player and fiddler
 Estil C. Ball (1913–1978), singer-songwriter, fingerstyle guitarist, and country, gospel and folk musician
 Wayne Henderson, guitar maker and fingerstyle guitar player
 Kenneth Y. Tomlinson, former editor of Reader's Digest

See also
 National Register of Historic Places in Grayson County, Virginia
 North Carolina–Tennessee–Virginia Corners
 Grayson Highlands State Park

References

External links

 

 
Virginia counties
1793 establishments in Virginia
Counties of Appalachia